Semino Rossi (born May 29, 1962, at Rosario, Argentina) is an Argentine-Tyrolean schlager singer. He has sold more than 3.3 million records and has reached top charts in Austria with six of his albums. He mostly sings in German.

Early life and career
Semino Rossi was born in Argentina in 1962, the son of a tango singer and a pianist. He received piano lessons from his mother and learned guitar by himself. In 1985 he came to Austria via Spain, originally earned his living as a street musician, later with engagements in hotels in Spain, Italy, Switzerland and Austria.  In Germany, he became known in 2004 with his appearances at the local Winterfest der Volksmusik ("folk music winter festival").

In the spring of 2007, he completed his first solo tour with his own band through Germany and Austria.  In July 2008 the single Rot sind die Rosen was released, which reached 53rd in Austria and 52nd in Germany.  His eighth studio album Symphonie des Lebens, released in March 2013, was produced by Dieter Bohlen and went double-platinum in Austria. In 2017, his ninth album Ein Teil von mir was released, which reached number 1 in Austria and went platinum and reached number 4 with gold in Germany.  In July 2019 his tenth studio album So ist das Leben was released, which reached the first chart in Austria and Switzerland and second in Germany.

Discography

Albums
Studio albums

Live albums

Compilation albums

Singles

References

External links
Semino Rossi

1962 births
Schlager musicians
Living people
Argentine people of Italian descent